Kalpana House is a 1989 Indian Malayalam-language horror film, directed by P. Chandrakumar. The film stars Kapil Dev, Divya, Abhilasha and Shafeeq. The film has musical score by Anu Malik. It was dubbed in Hindi, Tamil, Telugu as Bungalow No 666, Amavasai Iravil, Inti No.13 Respectively.

Plot 
Kalpana House is basically an unofficial Malayalam remake of Fright Night. Tony (Shafiq) keeps seeing strange things at his next door neighbor's house. Coffins and strange crates come in and out of the house, and women go into the house only to disappear. Tony gets the cops involved only to prove nothing, and hires a big muscle-bound ruffian to break in only to be killed. But when a vampire named John Peter (Kapil Dev) visits his house and threatens his life, ending in a confrontation where Tony stabs the vampire in the hand with a paint brush, Tony then gets help from his best friend with a truly annoying laugh who directs him to a priest. The priest doesn't believe Tony's neighbor is a vampire, making John Peter drink holy water (which John Peter does) but notices John Peter doesn't cast a reflection in a mirror. John Peter turns Tony's friend into a vampire, who then attacks the priest who thwarts him with a cross. Later the priest visits Tony's house only to get attacked by Tony's friend again who turns into a vicious dog. The priest stabs Tony's friend and the werewolf dissolves. John Peter kidnaps Tony's girlfriend from a night club, killing a cop and Tony, the priest and the priest's helper have a final confrontation.

Cast

Kapil Dev as John Peter/Dracula
Shafeeq as Tony
Divya as Celine
Abhilasha as Sujithra, Serial actress
Jagathy Sreekumar as Louis Fernandez
Sathaar as David
Nanditha Bose as Tony's Mother
Oduvil Unnikrishnan as Priest d'Souza

Soundtrack
The music was composed by Anu Malik and the lyrics were written by Poovachal Khader.

References

External links
 

1989 films
1980s Malayalam-language films
Indian horror films
Films scored by Anu Malik
1989 horror films
Films directed by P. Chandrakumar